St Philip's Marsh depot is a railway depot located in the St Philip's Marsh district of Bristol, England. It was established as a steam locomotive shed in 1910 but this facility closed in the 1960s. A new diesel facility opened nearby at Marsh Junction in 1959). This has since been combined with a new shed which was opened in 1976 to maintain new InterCity 125 trainsets.

History

St. Phillip's Marsh steam shed

 was the western terminus for the Great Western Railway (GWR) from London Paddington. The initial small locomotive service facilities expanded as other railway lines were opened. After the GWR absorbed the Bristol and Exeter Railway in 1876, the latter's workshops at Bristol Bath Road, which were adjacent to Temple Meads station, became the principal GWR locomotive repair and maintenance facility in the area. 

In July 1910 a new shed was opened at St Philip's Marsh alongside a line which allowed through trains to avoid going through Bristol Temple Meads station. This new shed was mainly allocated freight locomotives including 0-6-0 Pannier Tanks which plied their trade mainly in either Bristol Docks or at Avonmouth. Bath Road, which could not expand due to the proximity of the River Avon, now serviced mostly passenger train locomotives

St Philip's Marsh shed was constructed to Churchward's standard design with two-turntables and a north light roof. The layout allowed for two additional turntables to the rear of the structure should they be required. There was a standard pattern twin-ramp coaling stage, but the repair shop was only a small two-road building, due to the closeness of Bristol (Bath Road). A boiler washing plant was added in 1924, and ash shelters during World War II.

After 1948 and under Western Region of British Railways control, both Bath Road (82A) and St Philip's Marsh (82B) gained additional locomotives following the closure of the local London Midland and Scottish Railway sheds. St Philip's Marsh closed to steam in June 1964. The locomotive sheds were subsequently demolished and the site disconnected from the rail network west of Albert Crescent by the 1970s. The site of the locomotive sheds has been redeveloped as a fruit market.

Marsh Junction depot

A four-road diesel depot was opened in 1959. Diesel locomotives were serviced at Bath Road depot after it was rebuilt a few years later but diesel multiple units (DMUs) continued to be serviced here. From 1970 the depot was used for maintaining permanent way plant and most DMU work was transferred to Bath Road.

Philips Marsh HST depot
This opened in 1976 and had three roads, each capable of holding an entire InterCity 125 (or HST) trainset under cover. Open air sidings were available opposite the site of the old steam shed. In 2006 First Great Western created a new maintenance shed adjacent to the HST sheds, and upgrading other site facilities, at a cost of £8million.

Present

St Philip's Marsh T&RSMD is owned by Network Rail, operating under code PM, and leased to the present-day Great Western Railway. The site is used for the maintenance of their InterCity 125 trains which operate between London Paddington, Bristol and South Wales. Both Class 43 power cars and Mark 3 coaching stock are serviced here. It is also used to maintain their fleet of British Rail Class 150 Sprinter DMUs which had previously been maintained (for the Wessex Trains franchise) at Cardiff Canton.

References

Sources

External links

, St Philip's Marsh locomotive sheds
, 1959 DMU sheds

Railway depots in England
Buildings and structures in Bristol